Kyle Alan Howard (born April 13, 1978) is an American actor.

Early life
Howard grew up in Loveland, Colorado. He has worked in both film and television. His film career includes House Arrest alongside Jamie Lee Curtis, Skeletons with Ron Silver, Orange County and The Paper Brigade. His work includes a Coca-Cola commercial with talking ice cubes that are anxious to be bathed in cola.

Career

Acting
Howard played Bobby Newman on the TBS original series My Boys. Howard's previous television work includes Love Boat: The Next Wave, Related, Grosse Pointe, and Run of the House. He has also guest-starred in CSI, Home Improvement, Chicago Hope, What I Like About You, The Drew Carey Show, Numbers, 8 Simple Rules, Friends, Nip/Tuck, Ghost Whisperer and Don't Trust the B---- in Apartment 23. He played the character Dickey in Baby Geniuses in 1999.

Howard starred alongside Milo Ventimiglia and Chris Evans as one of three boys in an all-girls school in Opposite Sex on Fox's summer 2000 schedule. The show was canceled after 8 episodes.

In May 2010, NBC announced that Howard would star in the upcoming television series Perfect Couples. The half-hour romantic comedy was expected to premiere for the 2010–11 television season.  However, on July 1, 2010, Deadline.com reported that Kyle Bornheimer had replaced Kyle Howard as Dave because of uncertainty about whether the actor would be available due to TBS' decision to see how the fourth season of My Boys performed before it was renewed or canceled. It was canceled two months later.

As of 2011, Howard plays Dr. Paul Van Dyke on Royal Pains. In 2015, Howard began playing the starring role of Oliver in Your Family or Mine.

In 2020, Howard played Budd Skriff in Upside-Down Magic.

Filmography

Film

Television

References

External links
 
 PopGurls Interview: Kyle Howard

1978 births
20th-century American male actors
21st-century American male actors
American male film actors
American male television actors
American male voice actors
Living people
Male actors from Colorado
People from Loveland, Colorado
American expatriate male actors in the United Kingdom